Charles Conway Hartigan (September 13, 1882 – February 25, 1944) was born in Norwich, New York and died in Edgewater, Maryland. He graduated from the United States Naval Academy in 1906.

He received the Medal of Honor for actions at the United States occupation of Veracruz. He is a veteran of World War I and commanded the ill-fated  from 1937 to 1939.

Medal of Honor citation
Rank: Lieutenant

Organization: U.S. Navy

Born:13 September 1882,  Middletown, NY

Accredited to: New York

Date of issue: 12/04/1915

Citation Arlington National Cemetery

For distinguished conduct in battle, engagement of Vera Cruz, 22 April 1914. During the second day's fighting the service performed by him was eminent and conspicuous. He was conspicuous for the skillful handling of his company under heavy rifle and machinegun fire, for which conduct he was commended by his battalion commander.

See also

List of Medal of Honor recipients (Veracruz)
List of United States Naval Academy alumni (Medal of Honor)

References

External links

1882 births
1944 deaths
United States Navy Medal of Honor recipients
United States Naval Academy alumni
United States Navy admirals
Burials at Arlington National Cemetery
Battle of Veracruz (1914) recipients of the Medal of Honor
People from Norwich, New York
United States Navy personnel of World War I